Stade Omnisports de Kinkala is a multiuse stadium in Kinkala, Republic of the Congo with a capacity of 12,000 people.

References

Football venues in the Republic of the Congo
Athletics (track and field) venues in the Republic of the Congo
Sports venues in the Republic of the Congo